The Brumadinho dam disaster occurred on 25 January 2019 when Dam I,  a tailings dam at the Córrego do Feijão iron ore mine,  east of Brumadinho, Minas Gerais, Brazil, suffered a catastrophic failure. The dam is owned by Vale, the same company that was involved in the 2015 Mariana dam disaster. The dam released a mudflow that advanced through the mine's offices, including a cafeteria during lunchtime, along with houses, farms, inns, and roads downstream. 270 people died as a result of the collapse, of whom 259 were officially confirmed dead, in January 2019, and 11 others reported as missing, whose bodies had not been found.

Background
According to the national registry of the National Mining Agency, the Córrego do Feijão dam, built in 1976 by the Ferteco Mineração and acquired by the iron ore miner Vale in 2001, was classified as a small structure with low risk of high potential damage. In a statement, the State Department of Environment and Sustainable Development reported that the venture was duly licensed. In December 2018, Vale obtained a license to reuse waste from the dam (about 11.7 million cubic meters) and to close down activities. The dam had not received tailings since 2014 and, according to the company, underwent bi-weekly field inspections.

Vale SA knew that sensors monitoring the dam's structural integrity had problems.

Mariana dam disaster
The Brumadinho dam failure occurred three years and two months after the Mariana dam disaster from November 2015, which killed 19 people and destroyed the village of Bento Rodrigues. The Mariana disaster is considered the worst environmental disaster in Brazil's history and as of January 2019 was still under investigation. Brazil's weak regulatory structures and regulatory gaps allowed the Mariana dam's failure. Three years after the Mariana dam collapse, the companies involved in that environmental disaster have paid only 3.4% of R$785 million in fines. In November 2015, the department in charge of inspecting mining operations in the state of Minas Gerais, the National Department of Mineral Production (DNPM), was worried about the retirement of another 40% of public employees over the course of the next two years.

Collapse

The collapse occurred just after noon, at 12:28 PM. At 3:50 p.m., the mud reached the Paraopeba River, the region's main river, which supplies water to one third of the Greater Belo Horizonte region.

The Inhotim Institute, one of largest open-air art centres in Latin America, located in Brumadinho, was evacuated as a precaution, although the mudflow did not reach the sculpture park.

On 27 January, around 5:30 a.m., sirens were sounded amid fears for the stability of the mine's adjacent Dam VI, a process water reservoir, where increased water levels were detected. Due to the risk, about 24,000 residents from several districts of Brumadinho were evacuated, including the city's downtown area. Rescue operations were suspended for several hours.

Aftermath

Victims
On January 26, 2019, Vale's president, Fabio Schvartsman, stated that most of the victims are Vale's employees. Three locomotives and 132 wagons were buried and four railwaymen were missing. The mud destroyed two sections of railway bridge and about 100 metres of railway track. As of January 2020, 259 people were confirmed dead, and 11 were considered missing. Figures were later amended to 270 deaths.

Environment

The dam failure released around 12 million cubic metres of tailings. Metals in the tailings were incorporated into the river sediments, with a diminishing effect at increasing distance from the site of the spill. At Retiro Baixo, 302 km downstream from the minesite, of the 27 elements analysed only cadmium displayed severe enrichment. All others showed minor or no enrichment in the river sediments.

Vale's president, Fabio Schvartsman, said that the dam had been inactive since 2015 and that the material should not be moving too much. "I believe that the environmental risk, in this case, will be much lower than that of Mariana", he said.

Economic impact 
As a result of the disaster, on 28 January the Vale S.A. stock price fell 24%, losing 71.3 billion reais (US$19 billion) in market capitalization, the biggest single day loss in the history of the Brazilian stock market, surpassing May 2018, when Petrobrás lost more than R$47 billion in market value.  At the end of January 28,  Vale's debt was downgraded to a rating of BBB- by Fitch Ratings.

In the city of Brumadinho, many agricultural areas were affected or totally destroyed. The local livestock industry suffered damages, mainly from loss of animals such as cattle and poultry. The local market was also impacted due to the damages, with some stores and establishments remaining closed for a few days.

Impact on the public water supply
The water supply company Companhia de Saneamento de Minas Gerais (COPASA) stated that the tailings had not compromised public water supply, but as a precaution, suspended abstraction of the river water in the communities of Brumadinho, Juatuba, and Pará de Minas. Due to the importance of the river for the municipality, the Agência Reguladora dos Serviços de Água e Esgoto de Pará de Minas (ARSAP) reported that operations could go on as normal.

Following assessment by state and federal health, environment, and agriculture agencies, the Minas Gerais Government announced on 31 January that raw water from the Paraopeba River, from its confluence with Ribeirão Ferro-Carvão to Pará de Mina, posed risks to human and animal health and should not be consumed. Tests demonstrated that twenty other municipalities were affected by the dam’s collapse. The effects of the pollution impacted communities 120 km beyond Brumadhino.

Reactions
The President of Brazil, Jair Bolsonaro, sent three ministers to follow the rescue efforts. The Governor of Minas Gerais, Romeu Zema, announced the formation of a task force to rescue the victims.

The Israeli government sent a 130 strong group including specialist engineers, doctors, search and rescue teams, firefighters and naval divers to Brumadinho to aid Brazilian specialists in finding possible survivors.

On January 29, Brazilian authorities issued arrest warrants for five employees believed to be connected with the dam collapse, leading to two senior managers of the mine and another Vale employee being arrested, alongside two engineers from the German company TÜV Süd who had been contracted to inspect the dam.

The local mining union's treasurer called the disaster "premeditated" as there were continuous and long-standing complaints and warnings about the structural integrity of the dam. Vale denied these charges and stated the mine was up-to-date with the latest standards.

One day after the failure, the Brazilian Institute of Environment and Renewable Natural Resources announced a R$250 million fine on the Vale company.

Brazilian judicial authorities froze US$3 billion of Vale's assets, saying real estate and vehicles would be seized if the company could not come up with the money.

In April, Vale's safety inspectors refused to guarantee the stability of at least 18 of its dams and dikes in Brazil.

Brazilian prosecutors announced in January 2020 that Vale SA, auditor TÜV Süd, and 16 individuals, including Vale's ex-president Fabio Schvartsman, would be charged with intentional homicide and environmental offences. In January 2021, a group of Brazilian claimants brought the first civil lawsuit on German soil against TÜV Süd.

In February 2021, the state government reached an agreement with Vale to repair all environmental damage, and to pay the communities affected socio-economic and socio-environmental reparations, initially estimated at US$7 billion.

See also

Ajka alumina plant accident
Church Rock uranium mill spill

References

External links

 
 
 

 
 

Vale S.A.
2019 disasters in Brazil
2019 mining disasters
Dam failures in Brazil
Dams in Minas Gerais
History of Minas Gerais
January 2019 events in Brazil
Mining disasters in Brazil
Tailings dam failures
Dam controversies
Corporate scandals
21st-century scandals